The Queen Margaret Union (QMU) is one of two students' unions at the University of Glasgow, Scotland. Founded in 1890, it caters to the social and cultural needs of its members by providing a range of services including volunteering opportunities, entertainment, catering, bars and games.

History
The Queen Margaret Union was founded in 1890 by students of the Queen Margaret College, both named after Queen Saint Margaret of Scotland, in the West End of Glasgow to provide an outlet for their social and cultural needs.

The QMU originated in the basement rooms of the college until 1906, when the expansion of the college meant that the space was needed for teaching. A bazaar was held by the Board of Management (comprising elected students) to raise money to erect and furnish a union building to house the Union. The bazaar was held over four days and featured a number of stalls selling many different items from clothes to pieces of furniture. Although the funds were raised, a building was never created for the Union to occupy.

After a few years of trying to decide how best to spend the money, a house at 31 Buckingham Terrace was rented. In 1912, the College Club at the University of Glasgow went into liquidation and the QMU took over the premises at 67 Ann Street (now Southpark Terrance) until 1922 when it moved across the road from the Glasgow University Union (GUU, which only admitted men) in the John McIntyre Building, to be based at 1 University Gardens (left, now part of the Department of History). During this period, the QM Union mostly provided space for its members to study, discuss, debate and eat.

In 1932, as the Men's Union grew in size and had a building built at the bottom of Gilmorehill, its previous home in the John McIntyre Building was given to the QM Union. At this time in its history the QMU was beginning to explore, rather successfully, in the world of university debating. Men and other delegates were allowed to attend but only as "distinguished strangers", who sat in a separate gallery. Other facilities included a library, dining room, study space, and cubicles so that members who lived at home  the city centre could stay over after public transport had ended.

The building quickly became inadequate to provide for the University of Glasgow's growing female population. In 1968, a building at 22 University Gardens was built to accommodate the then so-called, "Q-Emma’s". The women of the QMU were often strongly involved in the debating circuit and especially in Rectorial elections and campaigns at the university.

However, for some years many students had questioned the division of the sexes at Glasgow, this became more marked with the passing of the Sex Discrimination Act 1975. The two unions had an agreement allowing reciprocal use of much of each other's facilities, but some saw the arrangement as unbalanced. The QMU allowed men to use the bulk of its facilities with a few restrictions, but the GUU confined women to the extension, excluding them from the older half of the building. The 'Mixing Debate' gained momentum in the mid-1970s, but neither union seemed willing to change its stance. As the decade came to a close, several men had requested to join the QMU. Consequently, it held a general meeting in 1979 and changed its constitution to allow men to become members. The GUU allowed women members one year later. The first male member of QMU was Michael William McCullough (b. 18 February 1958) whose application had forced the EGM (which amended the constitution) by the collection of over 500 signatures of support. Over 99% of the huge attendance at that EGM accepted the amendment. Disregarding Islamic universities, Glasgow was the last such institution to discriminate in any way on gender grounds in Europe.

A serious fire in 1982 shut the building for several months and sparked nearly a decade of financial problems for the Union. However, between 1989 and 1992, effective management and prudent financial control saw the Union become financially solvent once again, brought about by the presidents, board of management and general manager of that time.

Modern day
The early 1990s saw the QMU become an established live music venue. Notably Nirvana, Soundgarden, Smashing Pumpkins, Hole, Garbage and Belle & Sebastian all played on the Union's main stage. This continued with bands such as Coldplay, Biffy Clyro and Franz Ferdinand playing on the same stage in the 2000s. And in 2016, Troye Sivan performed at the venue marking his first visit to Scotland on his blue neighbourhood tour.

The late 1990s until the early 2000s saw the QMU redevelop many of its social and commercial areas, including all of its bars. Other recent notable events at the QMU have included supporting Charles Kennedy in his successful campaign to become Rector.

In 2007 and 2009, the QMU's member-run fortnightly publication, won the Best Magazine Award at The Herald Scottish Student Press Awards. It was shortlisted in 2006, 2008 and 2010. In 2010 Ruaraidh J MacIntyre, 's resident columnist won the 'Best Columnist' award at the Herald Student Press Awards.

The Union was again faced with financial difficulty in the 2000s as a result of the University of Glasgow cutting the block grant – the money annually supplied to both unions - by around half. This, exacerbated by the Financial crisis of 2007–08, meant the Union saw several consecutive years of financial loss. Responding to these financial difficulties, work by successive boards of management to engage with University management led to parity of funding with the Glasgow University Union for the first time in 2010 and the subsequent reinstatement of the block grant in 2011. However, many changes in the tastes, lifestyles and expectations of students have left the Queen Margaret Union - and many other student unions - facing severe problems.

During the coronavirus pandemic in 2020, when many workers across the country were furloughed and received 80% of wages through a government scheme, the Union came under criticism from a trade union and the University Rector for making 31 members of part-time staff unemployed. The decision was made prior the Government announcing the furlough scheme, which led to the Board of Management voting to reinstate staff until the end of their contracts.

Relationship with other student organisations
There are two Unions at the University of Glasgow with some students choosing to join both of them during, and after, Freshers' week. Some students think that joining both is not allowed, but many first years join both before deciding which union they prefer. In 2003–2004, both Unions attempted to change their Constitutions to allow for Automatic Joint Student Membership. The QMU successfully made the required changes, but due to an irregularity in procedures, the GUU did not put the matter to a vote and the process was abandoned.

The University of Glasgow is not affiliated to the National Union of Students (NUS), with the QMU instead being part of Northern Services, a purchasing consortium set up by the students unions of Edinburgh. In 2006, a referendum was held to ask the students of the university whether it should affiliate with the NUS, during which the QMU formed part of the "No to NUS" campaign.

Governance

Board of Management
The QMU is run by a student Board of Management bi-annually elected by the membership. The names of the Presidents of the Union are preserved on a board in the main stairwell of the Union and photographs of each entire Board of Management are taken at the start of their term of office and displayed on the walls of the Board Room.

The Board is divided into three distinct parts. The Executive comprises the offices of President, and two Vice Presidents (Vice President: Membership, Clubs and Societies and Vice President: Board of Management) and are charged with the day-to-day running of the union and maintaining a high level of discipline, member and clubs and societies involvement and representing the union externally. They oversee every event, operation and campaign within the Union, and also act as trustees.

The Convenors are each responsible for an aspect of the unions' activity. The convenors are Campaigns and Charities Convenor, Events Convenor, Publications Convenor, Social Convenor, Tech Convenor and Mental Health and Welfare Convenor. They each chair a committee of Union members, as described below.

The largest section of the board is that of the Current Student Representatives. The 'CSR Committee' is composed of twelve elected students, at least three of whom are in their first year of study, who are largely free to involve themselves with whatever aspects of the union they see fit. A Convenor of Current Student Representatives (CCSR) is elected from amongst them to represent the committee as a whole to the Executive and Convenors.

In addition to this, the Board of Management contains two Former Student Members, the Past President, Honorary President and two Honorary Vice Presidents. The current President of the Queen Margaret Union is Lachlan Farquharson.

Committees
The Board of Management is fed ideas through a committee structure. Committee meetings can be attended by any member of the Union, and active committees in 2022 are:

Events: The Events Committee assist the planning and running of all QM-run events that take place in the Union.

Tech Team: The Tech Team are involved with the practicalities of running the QM's events, including lighting and sound tech.

Social: The Social Committee are concerned with the planning and execution of the (almost-daily) events that take place every day in Bar - one of the Union's three bars - from pub quizzes and acoustic nights to comedy and new theatre drawn from the students of the University of Glasgow.

Publications: The Publications Committee are responsible for all Union publications, namely the production and distribution of qmunicate magazine, the Union's in-house news and views magazine.

Campaigns & Charities: The C&C Committee oversee all Union fundraising and campaigns. Fundraising for local, national and international charities and campaigning for wider causes has been an integral part of the Queen Margaret Union for many years.

Mental Health & Welfare: The Mental Health and Welfare Committee are involved in planning events and campaigns to help with students mental health such as de-stress days.

Facilities
The QMU offers a number of facilities over four floors. Aside from general facilities, the Union's facilities include:

Ground floor
 Venue: the Union's primary venue is used to host club nights and gigs, with a capacity of approximately 900. Amongst the most famous bands to have played there on their way to making it big are Queen (15 March 1974), Red Hot Chili Peppers (3 February 1990) and Nirvana (30 November 1991), as have other more recent bands such as Biffy Clyro. It has also been used for large pub quizzes, and for shows organised by affiliated clubs and societies.
 Soundbite Takeaway
 Cafe: serving hot and cold food suitable for snacks and lunches.
 Accessible toilets

First floor
 Bar: Many small Union events are run in Bar, including the Big Wednesday Night Pub Quiz (described by NME as the best in Glasgow).
 Games: the QMU's sports bar, complete with pool tables.

Second Floor
 StrEat Bites: A restaurant serving tapas-style street food from around the world.
 Soundbite Restaurant: A restaurant serving Asian fusion style cuisine.

Third floor
 The Executive office
 The Boardroom
 Committee rooms
 Laundry facilities
 TV room
 Administrative offices
 Gender neutral toilets

Archives
The archives of the QMU are maintained by the Archives of the University of Glasgow (GUAS).

References

Sources
 Union With Many Crowns from Cobain to Queen, Glasgow Herald, 4 January 2008
 Presidential Summit at the QMU, University of Glasgow Newsletter, Issue 279 October 2006
 We thought it was for the posh kids The Herald, April 2006
 Uni Considers Early Smoking Ban BBC News, August 2005

External links
 qmunion.org.uk

1890 establishments in Scotland
Students' unions in Scotland
University of Glasgow
Music venues in Glasgow
Nightclubs in Glasgow
Organizations established in 1890